Basque Pelota was a demonstration sport at the 1924 Summer Olympics in Paris.  It was the second time that the sport was included in the Olympic program; it was an official Olympic sport at the 1900 Games that were also held in Paris. It would be included as a demonstration in another two occasions at the 1968 Games in Mexico City and the 1992 Games in Barcelona.

A court was built at the Porte de Billancourt for the Basque pelota events. The teams of France and Spain were the only participants.

Events

Hand-pelota
 - 45
 - 26

Paleta
 - 40
 - 24

Basket-pelota
 - 60
 - 52

References

1924 Summer Olympics events
1924
1924 in basque pelota
Basque pelota competitions in France
Men's events at the 1924 Summer Olympics